Iguanid herpesvirus 2 (IgHV-2) is a species of virus of uncertain generic and subfamilial placement in the family Herpesviridae and order Herpesvirales.

References

External links 
 

Herpesviridae